Day After Tomorrow (also known as dat) was a 3-member Japanese pop band under the Avex label.

History  
Due to their music being produced by former Every Little Thing member Mitsuru Igarashi, Day After Tomorrow's music took on a decidedly similar feel to that group's music, particularly the more synthpop-based music that Every Little Thing released in their earlier years. As of the release of their best albums in August 2005, Day After Tomorrow had gone on hiatus.

Since the hiatus, Misono had performed as a soloist between 2006 and 2014, after which she quit music, though still performs on television variety programs. Daisuke Suzuki went on to play keyboard for the band Girl Next Door.

Misono's older sister is Koda Kumi.

Day After Tomorrow performed the theme song "More than a Million Miles" for the Japanese release of the movie The Day After Tomorrow.

Members 
 , real name:  – born October 13, 1984; vocalist and songwriter
  (nicknamed Maa-kun) – born October 25, 1974; guitarist and composer
  (nicknamed Dai-chan) – born October 27, 1978; keyboardist and composer

Discography

Albums

Studio albums 
 Day After Tomorrow (August 7, 2002)
 Day After Tomorrow II (November 20, 2002)
 Elements (March 26, 2003)
 Primary Colors (February 18, 2004)
 Day Alone (March 9, 2005)

Greatest hits 
 Complete Best (Day After Tomorrow album)|Complete Best (August 17, 2005),(September 20, 2006)
 Single Best (August 17, 2005)
 Selection Best (September 20, 2006)

Singles 
 Faraway (August 28, 2002)
 My Faith (December 4, 2002)
 Futurity (January 22, 2003)
 Stay in My Heart (April 16, 2003)
 Day Star (July 24, 2003)
 Moon Gate (September 3, 2003)
 Dear Friends / It's My Way (December 17, 2003)
 螢火 ／Show Time Hotarubi / Show Time (February 4, 2004)
 Lost Angel (August 25, 2004)
 君と逢えた奇蹟 Kimi to Aeta Kiseki (January 13, 2005)
 ユリノハナ Yuri no Hana (February 23, 2005)

Videography 
 Faraway (August 7, 2002)
 My Faith (November 20, 2002)
 Day Alive: 1st Live Tour 2003 Elements (December 17, 2003),(December 8, 2004)
 Day Clips (March 10, 2004)
 More than a Million Miles (June 9, 2004)
 Lost Angel: Ano hi、Midori ni kimi ga Ite (September 29, 2004)
 Day Alone: Manohra to Hime-chan (March 24, 2005)

External links

Japanese pop music groups
Avex Group artists
Tales (video game series) music
Musical groups from Tokyo